The 2016–17 Fairleigh Dickinson Knights men's basketball team represented Fairleigh Dickinson University during the 2016–17 NCAA Division I men's basketball season. The team was led by fourth-year head coach Greg Herenda. The Knights played their home games at the Rothman Center in Hackensack, New Jersey as members of the Northeast Conference. They finished the season 11–19, 9–9 in NEC play to finish in three-way tie for fifth place. They lost in the quarterfinals of the NEC tournament to Wagner.

Previous season 
The Knights finished the 2015–16 season 18–15, 11–7 in NEC play to finish in a three-way tie for second place. They defeated Saint Francis (PA), Mount St. Mary's, and Wagner to win the NEC tournament and receive the conference's automatic bid to the NCAA tournament. As a No. 16 seed, they lost to Florida Gulf Coast in the First Four.

Roster

Schedule and results

|-
!colspan=9 style=| Exhibition

|-
!colspan=9 style=| Non-conference regular season  

  
|-
!colspan=9 style=| NEC regular season

|-
!colspan=9 style=| NEC tournament

References

Fairleigh Dickinson Knights men's basketball seasons
Fairleigh Dickinson
Fairleigh Dickinson
Fairleigh Dickinson